Yakhab (also Romanized as Yakhāb) is a village in Kuh Yakhab Rural District, Dastgerdan District, Tabas County, South Khorasan Province, Iran. In 2006, its population was 198, in 45 families.

References 

Populated places in Tabas County